Thomas Mower Martin  (1838–1934) was an English-born Canadian landscape painter dubbed "the father of Canadian art"

Life and work 

Martin was born in London, England, the son of Edward H. Martin, sub-treasurer of the Inner Temple, and Susan
Abernethy. He was educated at various schools and lastly, the Military school in Enfield his father wanted him to become a soldier with the East India Company. But he was orphaned at 15 years of age, lived with an aunt (Kezia, sister of his mother Susannah Abernethy, and widow of Thomas Mower) who supported his desire to not proceed with military life and leave school to become a carpenter and draughtsman. He had had a hobby of sketching and painting, for several years and now, took part-time instruction at the South Kensington Schools in London but was mostly self-taught in art.

He married Emma Nichols (1842–1911)—they went on to have nine children. In 1862, they emigrated to Canada and built a small house in Muskoka, Ontario. Farming proved impossible because of the poor quality of the land and so the family moved and settled in Toronto, where Mower Martin soon became an established professional painter.

Martin produced landscapes, animals, still lifes and portraits in oils, watercolours and etchings. He was one of a group of artists given passes by the Canadian Pacific Railway to paint landscapes in western Canada—they became known as the "Railway Painters". Earlier he had travelled and painted landscapes through eastern Canada and the United States, and also provided illustrations for two books by A & C Black, Canada and Kew Gardens. He was a founding member of the Ontario Society of Artists in 1872, founding director of the Ontario School of Art (which today is OCAD University), and charter member of the Royal Canadian Academy of Arts in 1880, and was also a member of the Royal British Colonial Society of Artists (1909). Mower Martin exhibited widely as an artist during his lifetime and his works can be found in many public and private collections, including Windsor Castle in England.

Martin was a member of the Swedenborgian church and wrote philosophical leaflets for the organisation. He died at the age of 96 in 1934.

Illustrated books 

Campbell, Wilfred. Canada (A & C Black, 1907).
Moncrieff, A. R. Hope. Kew gardens (A & C Black, 1908).
Bealby, J. T. Peeps at many lands: Canada. (A & C Black, 1909).
Graeme, Toni Father of Canadian Art(TGraeme Enterprises, 2009).

References

Further reading 
Macdonald, Colin S. A Dictionary of Canadian Artists, Volume 4 (Canadian Paperbacks Pub., 1989) 
Lerner, Loren Ruth & Williamson, Mary F. Art and architecture in Canada (University of Toronto Press, 1991) p664.

External links 
 
Thomas Mower Martin (Biog at "Meibohm Fine Arts").
Mower Martin archive (Glenbow Museum)
Website

19th-century Canadian painters
Canadian male painters
20th-century Canadian painters
English emigrants to Canada
Canadian illustrators
Canadian landscape painters
English watercolourists
English Swedenborgians
1934 deaths
1838 births
Canadian watercolourists
English illustrators
19th-century English painters
English male painters
20th-century English painters
Painters from London
OCAD University administrators
Members of the Royal Canadian Academy of Arts